Gastromyzon megalepis is a species of ray-finned fish in the genus Gastromyzon.

Footnotes 

 

Gastromyzon
Fish described in 1982